Kathy Yvonne Taylor (born May 6, 1961) is an American gospel musician and artist. She started her music career, in 1999 as Kathy Taylor-Brown, with the release of Taylormade by Aleho International. This album was her breakthrough on the Billboard magazine charts, which it placed on the Gospel Albums chart. Her second album, Live: The Worship Experience as Kathy Taylor, was released by Tyscot Records in 2009. The album placed on the Gospel Albums along with chartings on The Billboard 200 and Independent Albums charts.

Early life
Taylor was born on May 6, 1961, in Houston, Texas as Kathy Yvonne Taylor, and her mother is Doris, of whom she was the fourth child.

Music career
Her music career started in 1999, with the release of Taylormade under the name Kathy Taylor-Brown, on November 16, 1999 by Aleho International Music. This album was her breakthrough release on the Billboard magazine charts, placing on the Gospel Albums at No. 22. She released her second album with Tyscot Records on January 27, 2009, Live: The Worship Experience, and this charted on the aforementioned chart at No. 6, along with chartings on The Billboard 200 at No. 190 and Independent Albums chart at No. 22.

Personal life
Taylor was married to Kenneth LaRue Brown, until his death in 2010.

Discography

Studio albums

References

External links

1961 births
Living people
African-American songwriters
African-American Christians
Musicians from Houston
Songwriters from Texas
21st-century African-American people
20th-century African-American people